Bob van Pareren (born August 6, 1948) is a Dutch politician and businessman who is a member of the Senate of the Netherlands.

Van Pareren holds a degree in business administration from Nyenrode Business University. He was installed as a Senator for the Forum for Democracy party in 2019 and was the treasurer for the FvD. He has also been a Member of the Provincial Council of South Holland since 2019. In November 2020, he left the FvD and formed his own Van Pareren faction in the Senate which later became a part of JA21.

References

1948 births 
Living people
21st-century Dutch politicians
Forum for Democracy (Netherlands) politicians
JA21 politicians
Members of the Senate (Netherlands)